Neville Township is a township in Allegheny County, Pennsylvania, United States.  Its land area consists entirely of Neville Island, which is an island on the Ohio River. The population was 1,084 at the 2010 census.

History
The island was formerly known as Montour's Island, named for the Native American interpreter Andrew Montour, who lived on the land in colonial times. Before the American Revolution, the island was claimed by both Pennsylvania and Virginia. Both states awarded a claim to the island to citizens of their states. The dispute found its way to the Supreme Court in Irvine v. Sims's Lessee (1799). Charles Simms won the case and gained possession of the island. It was eventually transferred to his partner in the lawsuit, General John Neville, for whom the island, and the township, is named. Neville lived on the island in his final years.

The township was incorporated on April 8, 1854, from a part of Ohio Township. It obtained first-class status in 1901.

A 1903 newspaper advertisement for real estate on the island promoted it as the next Manhattan Island.

Island Sports Center
In 1998, the Hillman Company built the Island Sports Center on the western tip of Neville Island.  Robert Morris University purchased the Island Sports Center in 2003.  The sports center includes a 1,200-seat hockey rink, a golf range, a miniature golf course, athletic fields and a pro shop.

Geography
The township boundary encompasses Neville Island and a surrounding portion of the Ohio River. The island, nearly five miles long, is the largest by land area in Pennsylvania.

Government and politics

Adjacent neighborhoods
Across the Ohio River's back channel, Neville Township runs adjacent with (from northwest to southeast) Coraopolis (with direct link via Coraopolis Bridge), Robinson Township, Kennedy Township and Stowe Township (with direct link via Fleming Park Bridge).

Across the river's main channel, Neville Township runs adjacent with (from northwest to southeast) Haysville, Glenfield (with the Neville Island Bridge as the direct link), Kilbuck Township, Emsworth, Ben Avon and Avalon.

The Neville Island Bridge carries Interstate 79 and the Yellow Belt across the Ohio River and over Neville Island, west of Pittsburgh.  The island is approximately a 15-minute drive from Pittsburgh, depending on driving conditions and other such factors.

Demographics

As of the census of 2000, there were 1,232 people, 624 households, and 313 families residing in the township.  The population density was 929.4 people per square mile (357.7/km).  There were 676 housing units at an average density of 510.0/sq mi (196.2/km).  The racial makeup of the township was 97.32% White, 1.22% Black or African American, 0.08% Native American, 0.32% from other races, and 1.06% from two or more races. Hispanic or Latino of any race were largely irrelevant.

There were 624 households, out of which 20.4% had children under the age of 18 living with them, 34.8% were married couples living together, 11.2% had a female householder with no husband present, and 49.7% were non-families. 43.8% of all households were made up of individuals, and 18.3% had someone living alone who was 65 years of age or older.  The average household size was 1.97 and the average family size was 2.75.

In the township the population was spread out, with 18.3% under the age of 18, 9.0% from 18 to 24, 27.4% from 25 to 44, 23.3% from 45 to 64, and 22.0% who were 65 years of age or older.  The median age was 42 years. For every 100 females, there were 94.9 males.  For every 100 females age 18 and over, there were 89.6 males.

The median income for a household in the township was $30,625, and the median income for a family was $44,083. Males had a median income of $31,827 versus $26,838 for females. The per capita income for the township was $19,630.  About 4.6% of families and 9.7% of the population were below the poverty line, including 8.6% of those under age 18 and 11.4% of those age 65 or over.

Gallery

References

External links

Neville Township website

Pittsburgh metropolitan area
Townships in Allegheny County, Pennsylvania
Townships in Pennsylvania